Wired Productions is a video game publisher company based in Watford, Hertfordshire, UK. The company publishes games on all main gaming platforms (PC, PS4, Xbox One, and Nintendo Switch) working on international projects, founded by Leo Zullo, Jason Harman and Kevin Leathers.

Before moving into publishing in late 2013, Wired Productions began as a video game production company by producing We Sing Robbie Williams and We Sing. Wired Productions first release was Let's Fish! Hooked On, a sports fishing video game developed for the PlayStation Vita. In 2016, Wired Productions released Super Dungeon Bros for Microsoft Windows, MacOS, PlayStation 4 and Xbox One. In 2017, Wired Productions launched Fractured Minds that won a BAFTA award. In 2020, Wired Productions released The Falconeer. The video game was nominated for Best Debut Game by BAFTA Games Awards.

In 2019, Leo Zullo and Neil Broadhead co-founded video games mental health charity Safe In Our World.

In 2020, the company announced a partnership with Koch Media to expand its global reach.

In 2022 Wired Productions announced Martha Is Dead was being censored on PlayStation.

Games published

References

External links 
 Official website

Video game publishers
Video game companies established in 2008
Video game companies of the United Kingdom